Vingtaine du Rondin is one of the five vingtaines of Trinity in the Channel Island of Jersey.

References

Rondin
Rondin